HMS Serpent, was an  torpedo cruiser of the Royal Navy.  Serpent was built at Devonport Dockyard, entering service in 1888. She was lost when she ran aground off Cape Vilan in northwest Spain with the loss of 173 people out of 176 in her crew.

Construction

Torpedo cruisers were small, relatively fast, ships intended to defend the fleet against attacks by hostile torpedo boats, while themselves being capable of attacking hostile fleets with torpedoes. The Archer class were enlarged derivatives of the earlier , which carried a heavier armament.

Displacement was  normal and  full load.

Armament consisted of six 6-inch (5 ton) guns, backed up by eight 3-pounder QF guns and two machine guns. Three 14-inch torpedo tubes completed the ship's armament. Armour consisted of a  deck, with  gunshields and  protecting the ship's conning tower. The ship had a complement of 176 officers and ratings.

Service

Serpent took part in the 1888 Fleet manoeuvres, where her machinery proved unreliable and in the 1889 manoeuvres. On 8 November 1890, Serpent left Devonport to relieve the sloop  on the West African Station. On the night of 10 November, Serpent was caught in a heavy storm in the Bay of Biscay and attempted to reach shelter, but ran aground on Cape Vilan near the village of Camariñas in Galicia, northwest Spain. All but three of her crew were killed. The resulting court martial investigating the cause of the loss of Serpent concluded that the ship had been lost as a result of a navigation error.

The dead are buried where they were washed ashore at the English cemetery, Costa da Morte, Galicia.

See also 
 HMS Captain: another Royal Navy ship sunk off the Galician coast in 1870

Citations

References 
 
 

 

1887 ships
Ships built in Plymouth, Devon
Archer-class cruisers
Victorian-era naval ships of the United Kingdom
Maritime incidents in 1890
Shipwrecks of Spain
Shipwrecks in the Atlantic Ocean